Jill Slay  is a British-Australian engineer and computer scientist. Her work has attracted international attention and she was made a Member of the Order of Australia for "service to the information technology industry through contributions in the areas of forensic computer science, security, critical infrastructure protection, and cyberterrorism."

Career
Slay completed a B.Sc. degree with honours in mechanical engineering from the University of Hertfordshire in Hatfield, Hertfordshire, England, in 1975. After working as a professional engineer she returned to university to undergo a Doctor of Philosophy in science education, at Curtin University: Perth, WA, AU, which she completed in 2000.

Upon receiving her Ph.D. Slay began her academic career as an information security researcher at the University of South Australia. During this time she was approached by South Australia Police to assist with cases involving computer devices. After 12 years at the University of South Australia, Slay moved to Namibia where she served as the Dean of IT at the Polytechnic of Namibia (now known as Namibia University of Science and Technology). Slay returned to Australia in 2014 where she was the Founding Chair and Director of the Australian Cyber Security Centre as a professor at the Australian Defence Force Academy through the University of New South Wales in Canberra.

Honors and awards
Slay was made a Member of the Order of Australia (AM) in the 2011 Australia Day Honours. She is a Fellow of the International Information Systems Security Certification Consortium and also a Fellow of the Australian Computer Society. In 2015 Slay was awarded the Australian Information Security Association InfoSec Educator of the Year.

References

External links
 

Year of birth missing (living people)
Living people
Members of the Order of Australia
Australian computer scientists
British computer scientists
British emigrants to Australia
British women engineers
Australian women engineers
20th-century British engineers
20th-century women engineers
20th-century Australian engineers
21st-century British engineers
21st-century Australian engineers
Australian mechanical engineers
British mechanical engineers
Alumni of the University of Hertfordshire
Academic staff of the University of South Australia
Academic staff of the Namibia University of Science and Technology
Academic staff of the University of New South Wales
Academic staff of La Trobe University
Idaho State University faculty
21st-century women engineers
Australian women computer scientists
British women computer scientists
British expatriate academics
20th-century Australian women